Tabb may refer to:

Places
Tabb, Virginia, an unincorporated community in York County
Tabb, West Virginia, an unincorporated community in Berkeley County

Other uses
Tabb (surname)
Tabb High School, in Tabb, Virginia (York County)
Tabb Monument, in Amelia County, Virginia
Tabb Street Presbyterian Church, in  Petersburg, Virginia

See also
 
 Tab (disambiguation)
 Tabby (disambiguation)